Harpalus mariae is a species of ground beetle in the subfamily Harpalinae. It was described by Kataev in 1997.

References

mariae
Beetles described in 1997